Live+ is an energy drink marketed to New Zealanders by Monster Beverage Corporation.  It was originally known as Lift+ or Lift Plus and created and produced by Coca-Cola Amatil based on the soft drink Lift.

History 

The brand, originally known as Lift Plus was which was introduced to New Zealand in 1999.  The brand over the years has seen an extensive marketing campaign, especially on the television show "Pulp Sport". The slogan for Lift Plus was "Sharpen Up!"  until mid-2011 when the new Lift Plus Extra Strength was launched and the slogan was changed to "wake up your buds" and "choose your level".  The choose your level slogan refers to the fact that Lift Plus Extra Strength has 32 mg/100 mL of caffeine when the Original Lift Plus has 14 mg/100 mL.

In 2011 Coca-Cola Amatil claimed that Lift Plus and the Mother energy drink had a combined share of 20 per cent the New Zealand energy drink market or 3.7 per cent of the non-alcoholic ready-to-drink market.

In 2018 the name changed from Lift+ to Live+ and ownership was transferred from Coca-Cola Amatil to Monster Beverage Corporation.

The drink was also available in Australia from 1999 to 2003, leaving many Australians disappointed with its replacement “Recharge by Sprite” which was short lived.

Varieties

LIVE+ Persist

LIVE+ Persist was formerly called Lift Plus Original. The original flavour contained 14.5mg of caffeine per 100ml, but now contains 30mg of caffeine per 100mL.

LIVE+ Ascend

LIVE+ Ascend was formerly known as Lift Plus Sugarfree  until 2009 and then Lift Plus Zero.

Live+ Ignite

Live+ Ignite was formerly known as Lift+ Green

Lift Plus Extra Strength

A discontinued Extra Strength version of the original Lift Plus drink.

See also
 List of energy drinks

References

Energy drinks
Coca-Cola brands